Natascha Celouch is an Austrian football midfielder, currently serving as SV Neulengbach's captain.

She has been a member of the Austrian national team.

Titles
 Austrian league (9): 2003–2011
 Austrian cup (9): 2003–2011

References

1986 births
Living people
Austrian women's footballers
Austria women's international footballers
SV Neulengbach (women) players
Footballers from Vienna
Women's association football midfielders
ÖFB-Frauenliga players